Saad Qureshi may refer to:

 Saad Qureshi (actor)
 Saad Qureshi (artist)